Shun Tin is one of the 37 constituencies in the Kwun Tong District of Hong Kong which was created in 1994 and currently held by nonpartisan Cheung Shun-wah.

The constituency loosely covers Shun Tin Estate in Sau Mau Ping with the estimated population of 18,307.

Councillors represented

Election results

2010s

2000s

1990s

References

Constituencies of Hong Kong
Constituencies of Kwun Tong District Council
1991 establishments in Hong Kong
Constituencies established in 1991
2003 establishments in Hong Kong
Constituencies established in 2003
Sau Mau Ping